The 46th Golden Bell Awards (Mandarin:第46屆金鐘獎) was held on October 21, 2011 at Sun Yat-sen Memorial Hall in Taipei, Taiwan. The ceremony was broadcast live by CTV.

Winners and nominees
Below is the list of winners and nominees for the main categories.

References

External links
 Official website of the 46th Golden Bell Awards

2011
2011 television awards
2011 in Taiwan